1971 earthquake may refer to:

1971 Bingöl earthquake (Turkey)
1971 San Fernando earthquake (Los Angeles, California, US), also known as the "Sylmar earthquake"
1971 Solomon Islands earthquakes (great doublet, tsunami)